Sang Jijia is a Chinese choreographer.  He was a dancer with Guangdong Modern Dance Company and City Contemporary Dance Company in the 1990s. 

Sang then studied with William Forsythe and worked with The Forsythe Company as choreographer and dancer until 2006. 
Sang is now Resident Artist of BeijingDance / LDTX and Guangdong Modern Dance Company.

References

External links
 
 Tibetan choreographer Sang Jijia – CNTN
 Sang Jijia – Snow/Duet at Sadler's Wells

Chinese choreographers
Contemporary dance choreographers
Living people
Contemporary dancers
Year of birth missing (living people)
Place of birth missing (living people)